Nguyễn Thu Hoài (born September 16, 1998) is a member of the Vietnam women's national volleyball team and Vietinbank VC.

Clubs 
  Vietinbank VC (2012 – present)

Career

National team

Senior team
 2019 ASEAN Grand Prix — 4th Place
 2019 SEA Games —  Silver Medal
 2021 SEA Games —  Silver Medal

U23 team
 2017 Asian Championship —  3rd Place
 2019 Asian Peace Cup —   Champion
 2019 Asian Championship —  3rd Place

U20 team
 2016 ASEAN Championship —  Runner-up
 2016 Asian Championship — 4th Place

Club
 2014 Vietnam League —  3rd Place, with Vietinbank VC
 2015 Vietnam League —  2nd Place, with Vietinbank VC
 2016 Vietnam League —  Champion, with Vietinbank VC
 2017 Vietnam League —  3rd Place, with Vietinbank VC
 2018 Vietnam League —  3rd Place, with Vietinbank VC
 2019 Vietnam League —  2nd Place, with Vietinbank VC

Awards
 2016 ASEAN Junior Championship "Best Setter"
 2019 Vietnam Women's Volleyball League "Best Setter"

References

1998 births
People from Thái Bình province
Vietnamese women's volleyball players
Living people
Vietnam women's international volleyball players
Volleyball players at the 2018 Asian Games
Competitors at the 2019 Southeast Asian Games
Southeast Asian Games silver medalists for Vietnam
Southeast Asian Games medalists in volleyball
Setters (volleyball)
Asian Games competitors for Vietnam
21st-century Vietnamese women
Competitors at the 2021 Southeast Asian Games